Bouts may refer to:
Aelbrecht Bouts (c. 1452-1549), An early Netherlandish painter, son of Dirk
Dirk Bouts, An early Netherlandish painter, father of Aelbrecht